Waikiki Theatre was located in Honolulu, Hawaii.  It opened August 20, 1936 and closed November, 2002.  It was demolished April, 2005. The architect was Charles William Dickey.

Hawaii's Waikiki Theatre Demolished

References

Theatres in Hawaii
Tourist attractions in Honolulu
1936 establishments in Hawaii
2002 disestablishments in Hawaii
Buildings and structures in Honolulu
Theatres completed in 1936
Buildings and structures demolished in 2005
Waikiki